Louise Nadeau  (born ) is a Canadian clinical psychologist. She is a professor in the department of psychology at the Université de Montréal in Quebec, Canada, recognized for her contributions to the field of addictions.

Biography 
Nadeau was born on January 28, 1947, in Verdun, Quebec. Her mother was a nurse and her father was a veterinarian. She earned a bachelor's degree and a master's degree from the Université de Montréal, and a doctorate from the Université du Québec à Montréal. 

In 1981, she co-wrote Va te faire soigner, t'es malade, a series of essays about prejudices facing women with mental health issues.  

In the 1990s, she was approached to join Educ'alcool, an organization that aims to promote moderation in alcohol consumption. She served as chair of the board of directors from 2007 to 2019.  

Nadeau is a professor in the department of psychology at the Université de Montréal. Her research program has focused on issues associated with women's drug use; mental health issues associated with drug dependence; and the epidemiology of alcohol consumption. Her recent work examines online gambling addiction. She has published over 300 articles.

Awards and honours 
In 2012, Nadeau was awarded the inaugural Prix Marie-Andrée-Bertrand, one of the Prix du Québec, by the Quebecois government. In 2013, she was awarded the Prix Acfas Pierre-Dansereau, given for researchers who contribute to the improvement of society. In 2015, she was elected to the Royal Society of Canada.

Nadeau was named to the National Order of Quebec in 2017 and to the Order of Canada in 2018.

Selected works

References 

1947 births
Living people
Canadian women psychologists
People from Verdun, Quebec
Université de Montréal alumni
Université du Québec à Montréal alumni
Academic staff of the Université de Montréal
Officers of the Order of Canada
Members of the National Order of Quebec
Fellows of the Royal Society of Canada